Charles Townshend, 1st Baron Bayning PC (27 August 1728 – 19 May 1810) was a British politician.

Background and education
Bayning was the only son of William Townshend, third son of Charles Townshend, 2nd Viscount Townshend. George Townshend, 1st Marquess Townshend, Charles Townshend and Thomas Townshend, 1st Viscount Sydney, were his first cousins. His mother was Henrietta Powlett, daughter of Lord William Powlett. On his mother's side he was a female-line great-great-grandson of Anne, Viscountess Bayning, daughter of Paul Bayning, 1st Viscount Bayning. Bayning was educated at Eton and Clare College, Cambridge.

Political career
He was Secretary to the British Embassy in Madrid between 1751 and 1756 and became known as "Spanish Charles" to distinguish him from his first cousin and namesake. In 1756 he was elected to the House of Commons for Great Yarmouth, a seat he held until 1784, and served as a Lord of the Admiralty from 1765 to 1770, as a Lord of the Treasury from 1770 to 1777 and as Joint Vice-Treasurer for Ireland from 1777 to 1782. Between April and December 1783 he was Treasurer of the Navy in the Fox-North Coalition. In 1777 Bayning was admitted to the Privy Council. He returned as Member of Parliament for Great Yarmouth in 1790, and continued to represent this constituency until 1796. The following year he was raised to the peerage as Baron Bayning, of Foxley in the County of Berkshire.

In 1807 he served as High Steward of Great Yarmouth. He lived at Honingham Hall in Norfolk.

Family
Lord Bayning married Annabella Smith-Powlett, daughter of Reverend Richard Smith and Annabella Powlett, in 1777. He died in May 1810, aged 81, and was succeeded in the barony by his eldest son Charles. Lady Bayning died in 1825.

See also
Marquess Townshend
Viscount Bayning

Notes

References 

Kidd, Charles, Williamson, David (editors). Debrett's Peerage and Baronetage (1990 edition). New York: St Martin's Press, 1990, 

1728 births
1810 deaths
1
Peers of Great Britain created by George III
People educated at Eton College
Charles Townshend
Members of the Parliament of Great Britain for English constituencies
British MPs 1754–1761
British MPs 1761–1768
British MPs 1768–1774
British MPs 1774–1780
British MPs 1780–1784
British MPs 1790–1796
Politics of the Borough of Great Yarmouth
People from Honingham
Lords of the Admiralty